The Women's singles race of the 2015 FIL World Luge Championships was held on 14 February 2015.

Results
The first run was started at 12:36 and the second run at 14:15.

References

Women's singles